16th Brigade may refer to:

Australia
 16th Brigade (Australia), an infantry brigade in the Australian Army
 16th Aviation Brigade (Australia)

United Kingdom
 16th Air Assault Brigade (United Kingdom)
 16th Infantry Brigade (United Kingdom), a British Army formation based in Palestine at the beginning of the Second World War
 16th Mounted Brigade (United Kingdom)
 Artillery Brigades

 XVI Brigade, Royal Horse Artillery, formerly I Indian Brigade, Royal Horse Artillery

United States
 16th Engineer Brigade (United States), a combat engineer brigade of the United States Army National Guard of Ohio
 16th Military Police Brigade (United States), a Military Police brigade of the United States Army headquartered at Fort Bragg, North Carolina
 16th Sustainment Brigade (United States)

See also
 16th Army (disambiguation)
 16th Wing (disambiguation)
 16th Group (disambiguation)
 16th Division (disambiguation)
 16th Regiment (disambiguation)
 16 Squadron (disambiguation)